Tepetlán is a municipality located in the montane central zone in the State of Veracruz. It has a surface of 83.90 km2. During the Pre-Hispanic epoch it was inhabited by the Totonac, the most ancient date in the one that one alludes as municipality in that of the 1 °. Of December, 1868 In the Cologne it named the village San Antonio Tepetlán, for decree of November 5, 1932, the head-board is called Tepetlán, remaining suppressed the first part of the name.

Geographic Limits

The municipality of  Tepetlán  is delimited by Acatlán, Chiconquiaco, Alto Lucero de Gutiérrez Barrios and Naolinco. The territory of the municipality is watered by small tributary rivers of the river Actópan.

Agriculture

It produces principally maize, beans, green chile, sugarcane and coffee.

Celebrations

In  Tepetlán , in June takes place the celebration in honor to San Antonio, Patron of the town, and in December takes place the celebration in honor to Virgen de Guadalupe.

Weather

The weather in  Tepetlán  is very cold and wet all year with rains in summer and autumn.

References

External links 

  Municipal Official webpage
  Municipal Official Information

Municipalities of Veracruz